Events in the year 2021 in Macau, China.

Incumbents 

 Chief Executive: Ho Iat Seng
 President of the Legislative Assembly: Kou Hoi In

Events 

 4 August – Macau launches compulsory COVID-19 testing for all 680,000 people at 41 testing centres and will close all cinemas, gyms, bars, and other entertainment venues beginning midnight after the first local cases were reported in the city in more than 16 months. Four members of a family were infected with the Delta variant.

References 

 
Years of the 21st century in Macau
Macau
Macau
2020s in Macau